Fire in the Wind is the ninth studio album by the folk artist John Stewart, former member of the Kingston Trio. It was released in 1977 on RSO Records. The album was re-released on CD on the Wrasse label in 2001 with five bonus tracks.

Track listing
All compositions by John Stewart except where noted.
Side one
 "Fire in the Wind" – 3:40
 "Rock It in My Own Sweet Time" – 3:55
 "On You Like the Wind" – 3:04
 "The Runner" – 3:37
 "Morning Thunder" – 3:21
Side two
 "Promise the Wind" – 2:28
 "Boston Lady" – 3:08
 "18 Wheels" – 2:43
 "The Last Hurrah" – 2:28
 "The Wild Side of You" – 3:38

 Tracks 1-2, 1-4, 2-1, 2-5 produced by Mentor Williams
 Tracks 1-1, 1-3, 2-3 produced by Mentor Williams with John Stewart
 Tracks 1-5, 2-2, 2-4 produced by John Stewart
 Mixed by Michael Stewart with John Stewart and Rick Ruggieri at Producers Workshop, Los Angeles, California

CD bonus tracks
 "Where the Wind Can't Find Me" – 3:23
 "The Old Gunfighter" – 3:07
 "The Sun Flies Shining" – 2:50
 "Zapata's Own Comrades" – 3:02
 "Auld Lang Syne" (Robert Burns, Traditional) – 3:58

Personnel
 John Stewart - guitar
 Jon Woodhead - guitar
 Troy Seals - guitar
 Reggie Young - guitar
 Joey Harris - guitar, background vocals
 Dave Kirby - guitar
 Shane Keister - keyboard
 David Briggs - keyboard
 Bill Cuomo - keyboard
 Mickey Raphael - harmonica
 Gary Weisberg - percussion, drums
 Kenneth Buttrey - drums
 Chris Whalen - bass, background vocals
 John Williams - bass
 Buffy Ford Stewart - background vocals
 Herb Pederson - background vocals
 Denny Brooks - background vocals

Additional personnel
 John Stewart - producer
 Mentor Williams - producer
 Arthor von Blomberg - executive producer
 Susan Herr - art direction
 Tom Nikosey - design
 Norman Seeff - photography
 Gene Eichelberger - engineer (Quadrafonic Studios)
 Rick Porter - engineer (A&M Recording Studios)
 Stuart Taylor - engineer (The Enctron Truck)
 Tony McCashen - engineer (Quad Teck Recording Studios)
 Steven Barncard - engineer (The Village Recorders)

References

1977 albums
John Stewart (musician) albums
RSO Records albums